Pilotdrift is an American experimental rock band formed in Texarkana, Texas.  Their sound has been described as "epic, orchestrated rock", with influences from space rock, cinematic orchestral music, jazz, psychedelic rock, dark n' dusty westerns, future pop, spoken word, electro-indie, and folk. They have toured the U.S and Canada with The Polyphonic Spree, Supergrass, Eisley, Midlake, and Guster as well as played shows with The Album Leaf, Jon Brion, Devotchka, Akron Family, Angels of Light, Dios (Malos) and more. They have also had their music featured in TV shows like TLC's Deadliest Catch and The Messengers.

History
Pilotdrift was formed in 2004 by singer-songwriter Kelly Carr, singer-songwriter Micah Dorsey, and fellow friends Ben Rice, Jay Budzilowski, Eric Russell, and John David Blagg. They played their first show with the self-released album titled Iter Facere, which was a mix of both Carr's and Dorsey's songs. Their fan base quickly grew, and thus they began playing more shows to larger crowds.  Eventually, they crossed paths with Eisley, Midlake, and the staff of Good Records, forming close friendships. Soon they would play an in-store show at Good Records where the owner and leading visionary of The Polyphonic Spree (Tim DeLaughter) would be.

DeLaughter and his wife Julie Doyle were wanting to build an independent label called Good Records Recordings, and they wanted Pilotdrift to be the first signee. Although Pilotdrift agreed to sign, Dorsey started feeling that maybe life on the road wasn't all too compatible with him, and decided that before the band embarked on this new adventure, it would be a good time to step aside. And so, it was Carr and the rest of the band that make up "The Drift".

"The musical dots this band connects produces a visual journey worth  weight in gold.  This is truly a treasure.  We at Good Records are all lucky we found it."

On May 20, 2005, Pilotdrift released Water Sphere under Good Records Recordings, which is considered their debut album. Water Sphere was half a rerecorded and remastered collection of Kelly's songs from the self release Iter Facere and half brand new songs from Carr. The album received  positive reception from critics and fans. Pilotdrift then went on tours with The Spree, Eisley, Guster and Supergrass.

In November 2011, Pilotdrift released the single "All These Things At One Time" from an upcoming album. The track features Micah Dorsey (now known as Moonstryder).

In 2018, former drummer Ben Rice was nominated for Record of the Year as producer of "Shallow" with Lady Gaga for the film A Star Is Born (2018 film).

Discography
All These Things At One Time - 2011 - Good Records Recordings (Single)
Caught In My Trap - 2006 - Original Electric Recording Company (Single)
Water Sphere – 2005 - Good Records Recordings
Iter Facere – 2004 - Pilotdrift (discontinued self release)

References

External links
Official web site
Pilotdrift Twitter
Pilotdrift Facebook
Good Records Recordings web site

Indie pop groups from Texas
Indie rock musical groups from Texas